Roy Cole (8 April 1912 – 22 November 1999) was a Canadian sports shooter. He competed in the trap event at the 1952 Summer Olympics.

References

1912 births
1999 deaths
Canadian male sport shooters
Olympic shooters of Canada
Shooters at the 1952 Summer Olympics
Sportspeople from Hamilton, Ontario